Octavius may refer to:

Topics of Antiquity 
 Augustus, or Octavius, the first Roman emperor
 Octavia gens, ancient Roman family (includes a list of its members known as Octavius)
 Octavius (praenomen), a Latin personal name
 Octavius Mamilius, 5th-century BC ruler in Italy
 Octavius (King of the Britons) or Eudaf Hen, a figure in Welsh mythology
 Octavius (dialogue), a 2nd-century defence of Christianity

Modern-era people with the name
 Prince Octavius of Great Britain (1779–1783), son of King George III
 Octavius Beale (1850–1930), Australian piano manufacturer
 Octavius Catto (1839–1871), American educator and civil rights activist
 Octavius Coope (1814–1886), English businessman and politician
 Octavius Duncombe (1817–1879), English politician
 Octavius Ellis (born 1993), American basketball player
 Octavius Frothingham (1822–1895), American clergyman
 Octavius D. Gass (1828–1924), American businessman and politician
 Octavius Gilchrist (1779–1823), English antiquary
 Octavius Hadfield (1814–1904), New Zealand bishop
 Octavius Hammond (1835–1908), English clergyman
 Octavius Leigh-Clare (1841–1912), English lawyer and politician
 Octavius Mathias (1805–1864), New Zealand clergyman
 Octavius Vaughan Morgan (1837–1896), Welsh politician
 Octavius Oakley (1800–1867), English artist
 Octavius Pickard-Cambridge (1828–1917), English zoologist
 Octavius Radcliffe (1859–1940), English cricket player
 Octavius Ryland (1800–1886), Australian educator
 Octavius Sturges (1833–1895), English physician
 Octavius Temple (1784–1834), colonial administrator in Sierra Leone
 Octavius Terry (born 1972), American athlete
 Octavius Vernon-Harcourt (1793–1863), Royal Navy officer
 Octavius Wigram (1794–1878), English businessman
 Octavius Winslow (1808–1878), English clergyman

Other uses 
 Octavius (ship), an 18th-century ghost ship
 Pint or octavius, a unit of measurement
 Octavius, a fictional character in a series of silent films portrayed by actor Herbert Yost
 Octavius (horse), a 19th-century racehorse

See also
 Gaius Octavius (disambiguation)
 Gnaeus Octavius (disambiguation)
 Lucius Octavius (name)
 Marcus Octavius (name)
 Octavian (disambiguation)
 Ottavio
 Otto Octavius or Dr. Octopus, a villain of the Spider-Man comics